James Marshall  (born 1980) is a former Director of the Number 10 Policy Unit.

Marshall was educated at Magdalene College, Cambridge. Before entering politics, he taught English at Shrewsbury School, where he was the youngest ever Head of the English Department. In 2016 he was employed as a strategic adviser for the construction company, Mace.

In 2011, Marshall was an adviser to the former Leader of the House of Lords, Lord Strathclyde. He has also been an adviser to three of the chief whips in David Cameron's government: George Young, Michael Gove, and Mark Harper.

The Prime Minister appointed James Marshall as her Director of Policy in June 2017, following his predecessor John Godfrey's resignation.

In July 2019, he was replaced as Director by Munira Mirza by new Prime Minister Boris Johnson.

See also 
 Downing Street Policy Unit
 Prime Minister's Office

References

External links 

 Theresa May's team: the PM's inner and outer circles

Living people
British special advisers
1980 births
Commanders of the Order of the British Empire